Radical 174 or radical blue meaning "blue" or "green" (see Distinguishing blue from green in Chinese) is one of the 9 Kangxi radicals (214 radicals in total) composed of 8 strokes. It is also the character representing the color ao in Japanese, a general term covering both blue and green.

In the Kangxi Dictionary, there are 17 characters (out of 49,030) to be found under this radical.

The xin zixing form, is the 168th indexing component in the Table of Indexing Chinese Character Components predominantly adopted by Simplified Chinese dictionaries published in mainland China.

Evolution

Derived characters

Variant forms

This radical character has different forms and stroke orders in different languages and different individual characters.

In modern Japanese, jōyō kanji adopts the handwritten form  and applies it to printing typefaces, while  is used for hyōgai kanji.

Literature

External links

Unihan Database - U+9751

174
168